Jaswant Singh (born on 23 February 1961) is an Indian Judge. He is the former Chief Justice of Tripura High Court and Judge of Orissa High Court and Punjab and Haryana High Court.

Career
Born on 23 February 1961 at Rohtak, Haryana. He was graduated in arts in the year 1980. He took his Law degree and Master of Business Administration from Maharshi Dayanand University. He was enrolled as an Advocate in the year 1986. In 1988, he started his practice in Punjab and Haryana High Court. He has served as the Additional Advocate General in the office of Advocate General, Haryana. He was elevated as Judge of Punjab and Haryana High Court on 5 December 2007. He was transferred as Judge of Orissa High Court on 8 October 2021. He was appointed as Chief Justice of Tripura High Court on 15 February 2023. He retired on 22 February 2023.

References

Indian judges
1961 births
Living people
People from Rohtak
Maharshi Dayanand University alumni